Paul Valentine (born William Daixel; March 23, 1919 – January 27, 2006) was an American film and television actor. He was married to Lili St. Cyr from 1946 to 1950 and danced opposite her on stage.

Biography
Born in New York City he was educated at P.S. 40 and the Central Commercial High School.

He began his career at the age of 14 with the Ballet Russe de Monte Carlo, and later used the names Val Valentinoff and Vladimir Valentinov with the Fokine Ballet and Mordkin Ballet.

From 1937 he made his Broadway debut in  Virginia, then appeared in theatre, TV, and night clubs. In 1944 he met Lili St. Cyr and choreographed her act, the pair marrying in Tijuana in 1946.

He debuted in motion pictures in 1947 in Out of the Past; his penultimate film appearance was in 1984's remake of that film.

Valentine was married twice, including to burlesque stripteaser Lili St. Cyr from 1946–49. He previously had a relationship with Sally Rand.

He died in Los Angeles, California, on January 27, 2006, aged 86.

Filmography
 Out of the Past (1947, originally released in UK as Build My Gallows High) - Joe
 House of Strangers (1949) - Pietro Monetti
 Love Happy (1949) - Mike Johnson
 Lights Out (episode: "The Silent Supper"; 1951) - Jean Duval
 Something to Live For (1952) - Albert Forest
 Armstrong Circle Theatre (episode: "The Shoes That Laughed" (1952)) 
 Love Island (1952) - Lt. Richard Taber
 Naked City (episode: "Susquehanna 4-7568"; 1958) - Larry
 Golden Showcase (episode: "Tonight in Samarkand"; 1962) - Angelo
 Vega$ (1978, TV Series) - Minister
 The Ropers (1980, TV Series) - Maitre'D
 The Man Who Saw Tomorrow (1981) - the Secretary of State
 All Night Long (1981) - Customer
 True Confessions (1981) - Detective #2
 Pennies from Heaven (1981) - Bar Patron #1
 Yes, Giorgio (1982) - Timur
 Quincy M.E. (1983, TV Series) - George Carlton Ward
 Against All Odds (1984) - Councilman Weinberg
 Lovelines (1984) - Mr. Van Der Meer

References

External links
 
  (as Valia Valentinoff)
 

1919 births
2006 deaths
American male film actors
American male television actors
Male actors from New York City
20th-century American male actors
American choreographers
American male dancers
20th-century American male singers
20th-century American singers